Nauchny Gorodok is a rural locality (a settlement) in Barnaul, Altai Krai, Russia. The population was 3,005 as of 2013. There are 22 streets.

Geography 
Nauchny Gorodok is located 22 km northwest of Barnaul by road. Gonba is the nearest rural locality.

References 

Rural localities in Barnaul urban okrug